Mamadou Idrissa Wade (born 9 June 1985) is a Mauritanian footballer who plays as a defender for Nouadhibou and until 2016 the Mauritania national team.

International career
Wade made his debut for Mauritania on 11 August 2010 against Palestine.

Career statistics

International
Statistics accurate as of match played 31 August 2017

Honours 
Ligue 1 Mauritania: winner (2007–08, 2013–14)
Coupe du Président de la République: winner (2009)

References

External links
 

1985 births
Living people
Mauritanian footballers
Mauritania international footballers
People from Rosso
Association football defenders
FC Nouadhibou players